Silvanus Trevail (11 November 1851 – 7 November 1903) was a British architect, and the most prominent Cornish architect of the 19th century.

Early life
Trevail was born at Carne Farm, Trethurgy in the parish of Luxulyan, Cornwall on 11 November 1851.

Career
Trevail rose to become Mayor of Truro and, nationally, President of the architects' professional body, the Society of Architects.

He was Cornwall's most famous architect, certainly of the 19th century. Following the Education Act of 1870 which created Board Schools, Trevail designed around fifty such schools throughout the county. He also designed hotels including the Headland Hotel, Newquay, Carbis Bay Hotel in Carbis Bay, and restored the church at Temple. He was said to be a man ahead of his time, a campaigner for sanitation improvements and an entrepreneur.

Selected works
 Atlantic Hotel, Newquay
Great Western Hotel (Newquay)
 Carbis Bay Hotel, Carbis Bay
 Housel Bay Hotel, The Lizard
 Castle Hotel, Tintagel
 Headland Hotel, Newquay
 St Lawrence's Hospital, Bodmin (which was demolished between September 2013 and February 2014).

Death
His success however, did not bring him happiness. Trevail had a history of depression and had been unwell for some time before killing himself. On 7 November 1903 he shot himself in the lavatory of a train as it entered Brownqueen Tunnel a short distance from Bodmin Road railway station.

References

Further reading

Perry, Ronald (2009) "Silvanus Trevail: social reformer, developer, architect", in: Ferry, Kathryn, ed. Powerhouses of Provincial Architecture, 1837-1914. London: Victorian Society; pp. 15–27

External links
 
 BBC Inside Out, on Silvanus Trevail and the Newquay riots
 Cornwall Record Office Online Catalogue for Silvanus Trevail
There are biographical references to Silvanus Trevail on the Library & Museum of Freemasonry website, www.freemasonry.london.museum under classmark BE68(Tre)Roy, which contains reference to a copy of the Journal of the Royal Institution of Cornwall for 2001

1851 births
1903 deaths
 
19th-century English architects
Suicides by firearm in England
People from Luxulyan
Architects from Cornwall
1903 suicides